Events from the year 2007 in Bosnia and Herzegovina

Incumbents
Presidency:
Haris Silajdžić
Željko Komšić 
Nebojša Radmanović
Prime Minister: Adnan Terzić (until January 11), Nikola Špirić (starting January 11)

Events

January

January 10: Mirsad Bektašević, a 19-year-old Swedish citizen of Bosnian descent, is convicted of terrorism-related charges by a court in Sarajevo and sentenced to 15 years' imprisonment.

February

February 20: NATO troops in Bosnia-Herzegovina carry out early morning raids on the houses of the children of convicted war criminal Radovan Karadžić.
February 26: The International Court of Justice finds Serbia guilty of failing to prevent genocide in the Srebrenica massacre, but clears it of direct responsibility and complicity in a case brought forth by Bosnia and Herzegovina.
February 28: The European Union announces plans to make significant cuts to the European Union Force in Bosnia-Herzegovina.

March

March 24: The United Kingdom announces the withdrawal of all British Armed Forces serving as part of the European Union Force in Bosnia and Herzegovina.

April

April 10: Serbia's war crimes court has jailed four Serb paramilitaries who were filmed as they shot dead six captured young Bosnian Muslims.

May

June

June 28: UNESCO designates 22 new World Heritage Sites, including Sydney Opera House, Canada's Rideau Canal, Japan's Iwami Ginzan Silver Mine, Turkmenistan's Parthian Fortresses of Nisa, India's Red Fort complexes, the Lope-Okanda Landscape of Gabon, the Richtersveld desert of South Africa, the rock carvings of Twyfelfontein in Namibia, the fortified tower houses of Guangdong Province in the People's Republic of China, Teide National Park in the Canary Islands, Spain, ancient beech forests of Central Europe, Mehmed Paša Sokolović Bridge in Bosnia and Herzegovina, Bordeaux and the Port de la Lune in France, the Old Town of Corfu in Greece, the Palace of Galerius in Gamzigrad-Romuliana in Serbia.

July

August

August 29: The Red Cross reports that at least 17,000 are still missing from the former Yugoslavia, including 13,400 from the Bosnian wars, 2,300 from the Croatian conflict and 2,047 from the Kosovo conflict.

September

October

November

December

Deaths

May 19: Miroslav Deronjić, 52, politician and convicted war criminal, natural causes.
September 2: Safet Isović, 71, singer.
September 30: Milan Jelić, 51, politician, president of Republika Srpska entity (2006–2007), heart attack.

References

 
Years of the 21st century in Bosnia and Herzegovina
2000s in Bosnia and Herzegovina
Bosnia and Herzegovina
Bosnia and Herzegovina